Football Club de Mtsapéré is a football club from Mtsapere, Mayotte. The club was founded on 11 February 1978.

Honours
Mayotte Division Honneur
Champions (10): 2005, 2006, 2007, 2008, 2010, 2013, 2014, 2015, 2017, 2018

Coupe de Mayotte
Winners (8): 1981, 1983, 1985, 1991, 1993, 1995, 1996, 2017

The club in the French football structure
Coupe de France : 4 appearances
 2001/02, 2004/05, 2019/20, 2020/21

Current squad

External links
  Official website

Football clubs in Mayotte
Association football clubs established in 1978
1978 establishments in Mayotte